Linger Awhile is the second studio album by American jazz singer Samara Joy, released on September 16, 2022, through Verve Records. It was produced by Matt Pierson. The album won the Grammy Award for Best Jazz Vocal Album and was responsible for Joy also winning Best New Artist at the 65th Annual Grammy Awards. 

Following Joy's wins, the album reached number 158 on the US Billboard 200 and reached number one on the Jazz Albums chart with 8,500 album-equivalent units.

Critical reception

Peter Moore of Jazzwise called Linger Awhile a "staggeringly fine album", noting "Guess Who I Saw Today" as a standout, and remarked on the "outstanding support from guitarist Pasquale Grasso, pianist Ben Paterson, bassist David Wong and drummer Kenny Washington" on the title track. Moore also called Joy's version of "'Round Midnight" a "wondrous take" and praised the "incredibly beautiful timbre" of her voice on "Someone to Watch Over Me". Veronica Johnson of JazzTimes found "much to be admired" and a "musical maturation" on the album, writing that it is a "nostalgic stroll through well-known and obscure standards" with a "mixing of swing and sweet tunes", complimenting "the romantic feel [Joy] infuses into songs".

Angelo Leonardi of All About Jazz commended Joy's partnership with guitarist Pasquale Grasso, opining that it is "inspiring" and "stands out" on "Someone to Watch Over Me", and felt that Joy "confirms all the good things that have been said about her: unusual interpretative maturity for her age, fresh chromatic variety, creative flair, [and] intense feeling", naming Linger Awhile album of the week.

Track listing

Personnel
 Samara Joy – vocals
 Chris Allen – recording, mixing
 Sampson Alvarado – recording assistance
 Donovan Austin – trombone
 Will Bennett – recording assistance
 Pasquale Grasso – guitar
 Kendric McCallister – tenor saxophone, arrangements
 Ben Paterson – piano
 Matt Pierson – producer
 Ryan Rogers – creative direction, design
 Terell Stafford – trumpet, flugelhorn
 Meredith Truax – photography
 Kenny Washington – drums
 David Wong – double bass
 Mark Wilder – mastering

Charts

References

2022 albums
Grammy Award for Best Jazz Vocal Album
Samara Joy albums
Verve Records albums